Mohammadabad (also Romanized as Moḩammadābād) is a village in Esmaili Rural District, Esmaili District, Anbarabad County, Kerman Province, Iran. At the 2006 census, its population was 126, in 23 families.

References 

Populated places in Anbarabad County